Sinocyclocheilus huangtianensis is a species of cyprinid fish in the genus Sinocyclocheilus. It is found in a cave of the Hejiang River (a tributary of the Pearl River) in Guangxi, China.

References 

huangtianensis
Fish described in 2011